Oryol, also transliterated as Orel or Oriol, is a city and the administrative center of Oryol Oblast, Russia, situated on the Oka River, approximately  south-southwest of Moscow. It is part of the Central Federal District, as well as the Central Economic Region.

History

Early history 
While there are no historical records, archaeological evidence shows that a fortress settlement existed between the Oka River and Orlik Rivers as early as the 12th century, when the land was a part of the Principality of Chernigov. The name of the fortress is unknown; it may not have been called Oryol at the time. In the 13th century, the fortress became a part of the Zvenigorod district of the Karachev Principality. In the early 15th century, the territory was conquered by the Grand Duchy of Lithuania. The city was soon abandoned by its population after being sacked either by Lithuanians or the Golden Horde. The territory became a part of the Tsardom of Russia in the 16th century.

Tsardom of Russia 
Ivan IV Vasilyevich decreed that a new fortress be built on the spot in 1566 for the purpose of defending the southern borders of the country. The fortress was built starting in the summer of 1566 and ending in the spring of 1567. The location chosen was less than ideal strategically, as the fortress was located on a seasonally flooded low ground easily targeted from the neighboring high ground. False Dmitry I and his army passed through Oryol in 1605; Ivan Bolotnikov in 1606; False Dmitry II camped in Oryol for the winter of 1607–1608. Polish forces sacked it in 1611 and 1615. While the population fled after the second sacking and moved to Mtsensk, the Orlovsky Uyezd continued to exist administratively.

Oryol was rebuilt in 1636. The question of moving the fortress to the more advantageous high ground was debated until the 1670s, but the move was never made. The fortress was deemed unnecessary and taken apart in the early 18th century.

Russian Empire 
In the mid-18th century Oryol became one of the major centers of grain production, with the Oka River being the major trade route until the 1860s when it was replaced by a railroad.

Oryol was granted town status in 1702. In 1708, Oryol was included as a part of Kiev Governorate; in 1719, Oryol Province was created within Kiev Governorate. The Province was transferred to the newly created Belgorod Governorate in 1727. On March 11 (February 28 old style), 1778 Oryol Vice-Royalty was created from parts of Voronezh and Belgorod Governorates. In 1779, the city was almost entirely rebuilt based on a new plan; and the Oryol River was renamed Orlik (lit: "little eagle").

Russian Republic 
After the October Revolution of 1917, the city was in Bolshevik's hands, except for a brief period between October 13 and October 20, 1919, when it was controlled by Anton Denikin's White Army.

Soviet Union 
Oryol was once again moved between different oblasts in the 1920s and 1930s: first as Oryol Governorate until 1928, then Central Black Earth Region between 1928 and 1934, finally in Kursk Oblast), finally becoming the administrative center of its own Oryol Oblast on September 27, 1937.

The Oryol Prison was a notable place of incarceration for political prisoners and war prisoners of the Second World War. Christian Rakovsky, Maria Spiridonova, Olga Kameneva and 160 other prominent political prisoners were shot on September 11, 1941 on Joseph Stalin's orders in the Medvedev Forest massacre outside Oryol.

During the German-Soviet War, Oryol was occupied by the Wehrmacht on October 7, 1941.

The French air squadron Normandie-Niemen fought in the skies over Oryol.

On September 19, 1943, in the Oryol, was the first parade of partisan units stationed in the Oryol region during the war.

Oryol was liberated on August 5, 1943 during the Oryol strategic offensive operation "Kutuzov" on the Oryol-Kursk Bulge. The city was almost completely destroyed. By Order No .2 of I. V. Stalin of August 5, 1943, on this day in Moscow, an artillery salute was given to the troops that liberated Oryol. Since then, the city has had the nickname, "City of the First Salute", and the day of the liberation from the German invaders was celebrated as the city's day.

Geography

Time zone 
Oryol has the same time zone as Moscow (Moscow time). Time relative to UTC is +3.00 18.

Location 

Layout

Oryol was founded at the behest of Ivan the Terrible in 1566, in the area between the Oka and Orlik rivers. Little information exists about its early history; the earliest data available refers to 1636, when the city was rebuilt after its destruction during the Time of Troubles. According to historian T. G. Svistunova, the 16th-century Oryol fortress had three lines of fortifications and consisted of a city, an ostrog and a posad surrounded by gaps. The city housed a cathedral, a voivode's (warlord or military leader's) house, government buildings and courts for the boyar children; the prison consisted of gunners' yards, a blacksmith, and two parish churches near the prison towers. In the posad was a sloboda. In 1636, Oryol was rebuilt by the voivode B. Koltovsky; it expanded with annexation of land beyond the Oka. Oryol remained a fortress city with a corresponding garrison; Pushkarskaya Sloboda was still located in the prison, boyar children and nobles settled on the left bank of the Orlik, and a Cossack sloboda developed near the Oka. Oryol lost its military character after the 1689 fire, when the partially-burned city fortress was not rebuilt.

In central Oryol, streets fan out from the fortress; two main axes are the Upper and Lower Korchak Roads. Opposite the fortress was probably a second marketplace in the Zaotsk section, where the dragoon settlements had a relatively-regular layout along the river. Away from the river, the grid becomes a fan. The cityits fortress, three marketplaces, two monasteries and a number of parish churcheswas developed from the river. Its structure was visible from the Oka: the central fortress, the fan-shaped center and the grid of the Zaotsk settlements. The city was connected by bridges, making Oryol a military fortress and a trade center.

The city's earliest plans, by Mikhail Buzovlev and Petr Botvinev, date to 1728. A 1778 plan fixed its radial layout, and a radial-semicircular system was proposed the following year. In 1848, a new plan including Polesskaya Square was approved.

Oryol's modern layout was developed in 1939 by Suborov, an architect at the Leningrad branch of Giprogor. The first post-war reconstruction plan was made in Lengiprogor under the direction of architect V. A. Gaikovich. Oryol's development required a new general plan, which was drawn up in 1958 by V. A. Gaikovich and A. M. Suborov of Lengiprogor. The city's center was Lenin Square, on which the House of Soviets was built in 1961. In 1966, construction of flood-control embankments in the central city began.

Climate 
Oryol has a humid continental climate (Köppen climate classification Dfb). Winters are moderately cold and changeable. The first half is softer, second with often warmings. Summers are warm, in separate years — they can be rainy or hot and droughty.

Administrative and municipal status 
Oryol is the administrative center of the oblast and, within the framework of administrative divisions, it also serves as the administrative center of Orlovsky District, even though it is not a part of it. As an administrative division, it is incorporated separately as the city of oblast significance of Oryol—an administrative unit with the status equal to that of the districts. As a municipal division, the city of oblast significance of Oryol is incorporated as Oryol Urban Okrug.

City districts 
Administratively, the city is divided into four districts:
 Severny (Северный) — population: 65,815 (2021)
 Sovetsky (Советский) — population: 74,315 (2021)
 Zheleznodorozhny (Железнодорожный) — population: 60,278 (2021)
 Zavodskoy (Заводской) — population: 103,288 (2021) (the biggest, oldest, and most populous)

Politics 
In February 2012, the city duma abolished the direct election of mayor. In December 2013, a referendum was held and 71% of the people supported the return of direct mayoral election.

Mayors 
 1991–1997: Alexander Kislyakov
 1997–2002: Yefim Velkovsky
 2002–2006: Vasily Uvarov
 2006–2009: Alexander Kasyanov
 2009–2010: Vasily Eremin
 2010–2012: Viktor Safianov
 2012–2015: Sergey Stupin
 2015–2020: Vasily Novikov
 2020–present: Yuri Parakhin

City-managers:
 2012–2015: Mikhail Bernikov
 2015–2017: Andrey Usikov
 2017–2020: Alexander Muromsky

Demographics 

According to the Federal State Statistics Service, in January 2020 the number of residents came to 308 838. It is the 66th place among 1117 cities of Russia for 2019.

Largest ethnic groups in 2010:
 Russians (96,8%)
 Ukrainians (1,1%)
 Armenians (0,4%)
 Belarusians (0,3%)
 Azerbaijanis (0,2%)
 Tatars (0,1%)
 Jews (0,1%)

Transportation 
The formation of the Oryol as an important transportation hub is due to the favorable geographical position of the city on the borders of the Central and Central Black Earth economic regions.

The city has trolley, tram and bus systems. These kinds of public transport cover the entire territory of the city. Each bus, tram and trolley is equipped with route indicators that inform about the route through the city, designated stops. There are also taxis and rental cars.

In past years, in the summer on the Oka River waterbus operated as a form of transport excursion and walking orientation.

Automotive 
In the Oryol converge important highways of federal and regional values:
  "Crimea"
 
 
 
 54А-1
 54К-16

The main intercity terminal: Oryol Bus Station

Trolleybus 

On 29 October 1968, a regular movement was opened. Length of the contact network . There are 4 routes for 2019.

Railway 
Since 1868, there has been a railway connection between Oryol and Moscow. Here converge 5 railway lines: on Yelets, Moscow, Kursk, Bryansk, Mikhailovsky mine.

The main terminals: Oryol Station, Station Luzhki-Oryol.

Tram 

On November 3, 1898, Oryol inaugurated an electric tram. The draft was prepared by the Belgian entrepreneur FF Gilon and firm «Compagnie mutuelle de tramways», which won the right to build not only a tram, but also lighting in the city. Oryol tram is one of the oldest electric tram systems in Russia. It is 1 year older than Moscow and 9 years — St. Petersburg. For 2019, there are 3 routes, which are operated: Tatra T3 (74 units), Tatra T6B5 (13 units), 71-403 (1 unit), 71-405 (1 unit).

Aerial 

The city is served by the Oryol Yuzhny Airport, which is currently not working.

Education
There are six institutions of higher education in Oryol, as well as four branches of such institutions from other cities.
Local
 Oryol Law Institute
 Oryol State Agrarian University
 Oryol State Institute of Culture
 Oryol State Institute of Economics and Trade
 Oryol State University
 Russian Federation Security Guard Service Federal Academy

Branches
 Oryol Branch of the Russian University of Transport (Moscow)
 Oryol Branch of the Russian Presidential Academy of National Economy and Public Administration (Moscow)
 Oryol branch of the Financial University under the Government of the Russian Federation (Moscow)
 Oryol branch of the Voronezh Institute of Economics and Law (Voronezh)

International cooperation

Twin towns – sister cities

Oryol is twinned with:

 Razgrad, Bulgaria (1968)
 Offenbach am Main, Germany (1988)
 Leeuwarden, The Netherlands (1990-2002)
 Zhodzina, Belarus (2016)
  Mary, Turkmenistan (2017)

Partner cities

 Kaluga, Russia (2003)
 Kolpino, Russia (2010)
 Kolpinsky District, Russia (2010)
 Novosibirsk, Russia (2014)
 Volokolamsky District, Russia (2014)
 Novi Sad, Serbia (2017)
 Maribor, Slovenia (2017)
 Penza, Russia (2018)

Notable people 

 Leonid Andreyev, writer
 Mikhail Bakhtin, literary critic
 Fedor Baranov, fisheries scientist
 Denis Boytsov, boxer
 Yulia Bravikova, rhythmic gymnast
 Felix Dzerzhinsky, security chief
 Afanasy Fet, poet
 Nikolai Getman, painter and Gulag survivor
 Timofey Granovsky, historian
 Vasily Kalinnikov (1866-1901), composer
 Yakov Kasman, pianist
 Anna Petrovna Kern, socialite
 Stanislav Lebamba, association football player
 Nikolai Leskov, novelist
 Denis Menchov, cyclist
 Artem Mikoyan, founder of the MiG aircraft manufacturer
 Fritz Noether, mathematician
 Nikolai Polikarpov, aviation designer
 Yevgeni Preobrazhensky, statesman
 Vladimir Karlovich Roth, neuropathologist
 Valerian Safonovich, statesman
 Aleksandr Selikhov, footballer
 Alexey Stakhanov, celebrated miner/engineer
 Pyotr Stolypin, statesman
 Maksymilian Stratanowski, painter
 Yakov Sverdlov, Bolshevik revolutionary
 Ivan Turgenev, novelist and playwright
 Aleksey Petrovich Yermolov, military general
 Gennady Zyuganov, politician
 Korsak-Koulagnikov, collegiate secretary Aleksey Ivanovich, titular councilor Vasili Ivanovich, provincial secretary Petr Grigorievich and his brother Mardari Grigorievich were reckoned among the nobility of the province of Orel in 1815 after examination the proofs of nobility registered in the 6th part of the Noble Register of Chernigov province

References

Notes

Sources

External links 
 
 Official website of Oryol 
 Unofficial website of Oryol 
 The murder of the Jews of Oryol during World War II, at Yad Vashem website.

 
Orlovsky Uyezd (Oryol Governorate)
Holocaust locations in Russia